This is a list of the National Register of Historic Places listings in Carson County, Texas.

This is intended to be a complete list of properties and districts listed on the National Register of Historic Places in Carson County, Texas. There are four properties listed on the National Register in the county. Two of these properties are also Recorded Texas Historic Landmarks.

Current listings

The locations of National Register properties may be seen in a mapping service provided.

|}

See also

National Register of Historic Places listings in Texas
Recorded Texas Historic Landmarks in Carson County

References

External links

Carson County, Texas
Carson County
Buildings and structures in Carson County, Texas